Frederick Harper (24 November 1863 – 19 January 1937) was a New Zealand cricketer. He played fourteen first-class matches for Otago between 1886 and 1895.

Harper was a stylish batsman and brilliant fieldsman who captained Otago in most of his matches. He made 53, the highest score of the match, and the highest score of the short New Zealand first-class season, in 1887-88 when Otago beat Canterbury. 

Harper brought Joseph Lawton to Otago in 1890 as New Zealand's first professional cricket coach, and paid half of Lawton's salary for the first year. Lawton's success led to his re-engagement for several seasons.

Harper was a partner in the firm of Messrs McKerrow, Lees and Co, soft goods merchants. He retired to live in Timaru with his wife, who survived him.

See also
 List of Otago representative cricketers

References

External links
 

1863 births
1937 deaths
New Zealand cricketers
Otago cricketers
Cricketers from Bolton